Schistura fasciolata is a species of ray-finned fish in the stone loach genus Schistura found fast-flowing streams in China and Vietnam.

References 

F
Freshwater fish of China
Fish of Vietnam
Cyprinid fish of Asia
Fish described in 1927